David Langhorst was the director of the Idaho Department of Parks and Recreation and Idaho Democratic State Senator and State Representative. Langhorst is a realtor. David Langhorst also became co-owner of J&R ELECTRONICS in 2005, a two way radio company based out of Kootenai County Idaho. Shortly after, him and other owner Jim M. Lemm began selling cell phones out of stores in numerous cities in Hayden, Coeur d'Alene, Twin Falls, and Boise Idaho. 
https://wireless2.fcc.gov/UlsApp/ApplicationSearch/applTransLog.jsp;JSESSIONID_APPSEARCH=ngMZS9ZQZTh0q7qxZ1MGT42V6cG8JLFgyFHvTL7V1v726vfz98P4!-1355138813!2124798598?applID=3090784&printable

Idaho Parks and Recreation 
Langhorst was the director of the Idaho Parks and Recreation from 2014 to 2020.

Political Career 
He previously served as one of four commissioners of the Idaho Tax Commission, and was formerly a Democratic member of the Idaho Senate, representing the 16th District from 2004 to 2008. He was also previously a member of the Idaho House of Representatives from 2002 through 2004.

Arrest 
Langhorst, was charged with felony aggravated battery, since he allegedly shoved a woman to the ground, according to a criminal complaint filed by the Ada County Prosecutor’s Office in August 2022.

References

External links
Idaho Tax Commission - About us official government site
Idaho Legislature - Senator David Langhorst official government site
David Langhorst official campaign website
Project Vote Smart - Senator David Langhorst (ID) profile
Follow the Money - David Langhorst
2006 2004 2002 campaign contributions

Idaho state senators
Auburn University alumni
Members of the Idaho House of Representatives
Living people
People from Farmington, Minnesota
Year of birth missing (living people)
State cabinet secretaries of Idaho